Jasazrin bin Jamaludin (born 3 April 1986) is a Malaysian footballer who plays as a midfielder for Felda United in the Malaysia Super League. He also studied at English College Johore Bahru.

He is one of the line up in the 2015 AFC Cup Final for Johor Darul Takzim FC against FC Istiklol on 31 October 2015 at Pamir Stadium, Dushanbe, Tajikistan

He is also one of the First Johorean played in the Final AFC Cup.

Honour

Club
Johor Darul Ta'zim
 Malaysia Super League: 2014, 2015, 2016
 Malaysia Charity Shield: 2015, 2016
 Malaysia FA Cup: 2016
 AFC Cup: 2015

References

External links 
 
 Saranan Amri Kepada 2 Anak Jati Johor

1986 births
Living people
Malaysian footballers
People from Johor
Association football midfielders
Malaysian people of Malay descent
AFC Cup winning players
Malaysia international footballers